Laura Gedminaitė (born 30 April 1993) is a Lithuanian shot putter. In 2010, she represented Lithuania in the 2010 Summer Youth Olympics, where she finished in 4th place.

Achievements

References

1993 births
Living people
Lithuanian female shot putters
Athletes (track and field) at the 2010 Summer Youth Olympics